This article is about the decorations of the Romanian Armed Forces.

The Ministry of National Defence of Romanian awards honorific decorations to show appreciation for conduct in mission. This decorations are not included in the Romanian System of Orders and Medals. 

The decorations consist of emblems, honorific insignia, plaques, honorific titles and service distinctions.

Emblems 

 Honour emblems
 Emblema Onoarea Armatei României
 Emblema de Onoare a Statului Major General
 Emblema de Onoare a Forţelor Terestre
 Emblema de Onoare a Forţelor Aeriene
 Emblema de Onoare a Forţelor Navale
 Emblema de Onoare a Logisticii
 Emblema de Onoare a Prizonierului de Război
 Emblema de Onoare a Informatiilor Pentru Aparare
 Merit emblems
 Emblema de Merit „În Serviciul Armatei României”
 Emblema de Merit „În Slujba Păcii”
 Emblema de Merit „Acţiuni Umanitare”
 Emblema de Merit „Ştiinţa Militară”
 Emblema de Merit „Rezerva Armatei României”
 Emblema de Merit „Partener pentru Apărare”

Honorific insignia 

Awarded with the occasion of the anniversary of special events

Honorific plaques 

 anniversary occasions
 reward for professional, sports, artistic achievements
 reward to foreign (visiting) military personnel
 when leaving a military unit or pension

Honorific titles 

Awarded to special units, or graduation series.

Service distinctions 

 military oath
 graduating from different military educational institutions
 taking part to foreign missions
 fulfilling missions
 taking part to multinational exercises
 having academic titles
 special results in the academic training

References 

 http://www.mapn.ro/smg/distinctii/index.php

Military awards and decorations of Romania